This article contains the results of the 2008 Republican presidential primaries and caucuses.

The 2008 Republican primaries were the selection processes by which the Republican Party selected delegates to attend the 2008 Republican National Convention. The series of primaries, caucuses, and state conventions culminated in the National Convention which was held in Saint Paul, Minnesota, September 1–4, 2008, where the delegates voted on and selected a candidate. A simple majority of delegate votes in September (1,191 out of 2,380) was required to become the party's nominee; estimates based on delegate pledges had John McCain surpassing this total after the March 4 primaries in Ohio, Rhode Island, Texas, and Vermont.

Candidates

The only candidate with a national campaign at the end of the primary season was John McCain. Withdrawn candidates who had national campaigns were Ron Paul, Mike Huckabee, Sam Brownback, John H. Cox, Jim Gilmore, Rudy Giuliani, Duncan Hunter, Mitt Romney, Tom Tancredo, Fred Thompson, and Tommy Thompson.

Overview of results

The data contained in the row entitled Actual pledged delegates is a subset of the data in the row entitled Estimated pledged delegates. It represents delegates won in contests where the final apportionment of delegates has already been decided, but does not include delegates from contests where the final apportionment depends upon the outcome of further caucuses or conventions.  Caveat lector: the below "Estimated total delegates" row totals 2,390 delegates, but there are only 2,380 delegates.

Dashes indicate that a candidate was not on the ballot. For contests that are in progress or upcoming all candidates have dashes.
These delegate numbers are estimates. Delegate will be officially allocated during later caucuses, primaries, or state conventions.
These delegations all have three additional delegates (made up of the party leadership) that will attend the national convention as unpledged. In the case of Idaho, three delegates are party leadership and three others are elected at the state convention; all six are unpledged.
These delegations use multiple caucus, primary, or state convention processes to choose national delegates on different days. These processes are explained below.

Results

Iowa caucuses

Caucus date: January 3, 2008
National delegates: 37

Official allocation of delegates will be decided during the state convention on June 14, 2008; until then, delegate allocations are estimates.

According to his campaign Website, Alan Keyes's votes were not counted nor recorded by the Republican Party of Iowa.

Wyoming county conventions

Convention date: January 5, 2008
National delegates: 12

Two additional national delegates will be elected at the state convention on May 10, 2008. Also, in accordance with Republican National Committee rules, Wyoming was stripped of half of its 28 delegates for holding primary contests before February 5, 2008.

Votes were not released by the Wyoming Republican Party.

New Hampshire primary

Primary date: January 8, 2008
National delegates: 12 (see note below)

In accordance with Republican National Committee rules, New Hampshire was stripped of half of its 24 delegates for holding primary contests before February 5, 2008.

Michigan primary

Primary date: January 15, 2008
National delegates: 30

In accordance with Republican National Committee rules, Michigan was stripped of 27 of its 57 delegates for holding primary contests before February 5, 2008.

Nevada caucuses

Caucus date: January 19, 2008
National delegates: 31

Official allocation of delegates will be decided during the state convention on April 26, 2008; until then, delegate allocations are estimates.

Tom Tancredo did appear on the official ballot, but Nevada Republican Party did not count or record votes cast for him.

South Carolina primary

Primary date: January 19, 2008
National delegates: 24 (see note below)

In accordance with Republican National Committee rules, South Carolina was stripped of 23 of its 47 delegates for holding primary contests before February 5, 2008.

Louisiana caucuses

Caucus date: January 22, 2008
National delegates: 0 (see note below)

The Louisiana caucus is not considered an official race and all the state delegates chosen during the caucuses are nationally uncommitted, but they could run on one or multiple slates. Louisiana chooses 20 national delegates plus 3 PLEO delegates during the state convention on February 16, 2008. All the delegates elected at the state convention are officially considered uncommitted due to state party rules, but the delegation of John McCain is having the majority at the state convention since he won the majority of delegates in the districts 1, 2, 3, 6, and 7. So it is very likely that all 20 + 3 delegates will support John McCain.

The official results have not been released, and some media have reported that John McCain won, that Ron Paul took second, and that Mitt Romney took a distant third. A slate of uncommitted delegates running on a pro-life platform was the overall winner.

Hawaii caucuses

Caucus date: January 25 – February 5
National delegates: 20

Florida primary

Primary date: January 29, 2008
National delegates: 57 (see note below)

In accordance with Republican National Committee rules, Florida was stripped of 57 of its 114 delegates for holding primary contests before February 5, 2008.

Maine caucuses

Caucus date: February 9, 2008 – February 29, 2008
National delegates: 18

Official allocation of delegates will be decided during district caucuses and the state convention on May 3, 2008; until then, delegate allocations are estimates.

Alabama primary

Primary date: February 5, 2008
National delegates: 45

Alaska caucuses

Caucus date: February 5, 2008
National delegates: 26

Arizona primary

Primary date: February 5, 2008
National delegates: 50

Arkansas primary

Primary date: February 5, 2008
National delegates: 31

California primary

Primary date: February 5, 2008
National delegates: 170

Colorado caucuses

Caucus date: February 5, 2008
National delegates: 22 (see note below)

Colorado chooses 21 other delegates during district conventions from May 24 to June 7, 2008.

Connecticut primary

Primary date: February 5, 2008
National delegates: 27

Delaware primary

Primary date: February 5, 2008
National delegates: 18

Georgia primary

Primary date: February 5, 2008
National delegates: 72

Illinois primary

Primary date: February 5, 2008
National delegates: 57 (see note below)

Illinois chooses 10 other delegates during the state convention on June 7, 2008.

Massachusetts primary

Primary date: February 5, 2008
National delegates: 40

Minnesota caucuses

Caucus date: February 5, 2008
National delegates: 0

This caucus is considered a non-binding straw poll. Minnesota chooses 24 delegates during district conventions from May 3 to May 24, 2008 and 14 delegates during the state convention on June 7, 2008.

Missouri primary

Primary date: February 5, 2008
National delegates: 58

Montana caucuses

Caucus date: February 5, 2008
National delegates: 25

New Jersey primary

Primary date: February 5, 2008
National delegates: 52

New York primary

Primary date: February 5, 2008
National delegates: 87 (see note below)

New York chooses 11 other delegates during the state committee meeting from May 20 to May 21, 2008.

North Dakota caucuses

Caucus date: February 5, 2008
National delegates: 26

Oklahoma primary

Primary date: February 5, 2008
National delegates: 38

Tennessee primary

Primary date: February 5, 2008
National delegates: 40 (see note below)

Tennessee chooses 12 other delegates during the state committee meeting on April 5, 2008.

Utah primary

Primary date: February 5, 2008
National delegates: 36

West Virginia caucuses

Caucus date: February 5, 2008
National delegates: 18 (see note below)

West Virginia chooses nine other delegates during a primary on May 13, 2008.

Kansas caucuses

Caucus date: February 9, 2008
National delegates: 36 (see note below)

Kansas chooses three other delegates during the state committee meeting on May 22, 2008.

Louisiana primary

Primary date: February 9, 2008
National delegates: 20 (see note below)

Party rules in Louisiana would give the winner (with more than 50%) of the primary all 20 delegates as pledged delegates, chosen at the primary February 9, 2008. Since no candidate won the primary with this majority, the 20 delegates selected at the state convention will be official uncommitted delegates to the RNC. In addition, Louisiana holds an unofficial caucus on January 22, 2008 where in each of the seven districts 15 delegates  where chosen to the state convention. Each district delegation is choosing three pledged delegates for the RNC. John McCain received the majority in the districts 1,2,3,6 and 7, so he won 15 pledged delegates.

Washington caucuses

Caucus date: February 9, 2008
National delegates: 18

Washington's 18 delegates chosen at the caucus are not bound to a candidate.
Washington chooses 19 other delegates during a primary on February 19, 2008.

District of Columbia primary

Primary date: February 12, 2008
National delegates: 16

Maryland primary

Primary date: February 12, 2008
National delegates: 37

Virginia primary

Primary date: February 12, 2008
National delegates: 60

Louisiana state convention
Convention date: February 16, 2008
National delegates: 23 (see note below)

Since there was no majority of votes (more than 50% for one candidate) primary on February 9, 2008, the right of determining the 20n delegates went to the state convention. Due to party state rules these 20 delegates will be going to the RNC as uncommitted delegates. In addition, Louisiana held an unofficial caucus on January 22, 2008, where 21 other delegates were selected .

Washington primary

Primary date: February 19, 2008
National delegates: 19 (see note below)

Washington chooses 18 other delegates during caucuses on February 9, 2008.

Wisconsin primary

Primary date: February 19, 2008
National delegates: 37

American Samoa caucuses

Caucus date: February 23, 2008
National delegates: 9

Northern Mariana Islands caucuses

Convention date: February 23, 2008
National delegates: 9

Puerto Rico caucuses

Caucus date: February 24, 2008
National delegates: 20

Ohio primary

Primary date: March 4, 2008
National delegates: 85

Rhode Island primary

Primary date: March 4, 2008
National delegates: 17

Texas primary

Primary date: March 4, 2008
National delegates: 137

Vermont primary

Primary date: March 4, 2008
National delegates: 17

Guam caucuses

Caucus date: March 8, 2008
National delegates: 6

Mississippi primary

Primary date: March 11, 2008
National delegates: 36

Tennessee Republican primary

Committee meeting date: March 1, 2008
National delegates: 39 (see note below)

Tennessee chooses 13 other delegates during the state committee meeting on March 1, 2008.

United States Virgin Islands caucuses

Caucus date: April 5, 2008
National delegates: 6

Pennsylvania primary

Primary date: April 22, 2008
National delegates: 62 (see note below)

* Delegates are essentially elected as unpledged to the national convention in the Pennsylvania primary.

Minnesota district conventions
Convention date: May 3, 2008 – May 24, 2008
National delegates: 24 (see note below)

Minnesota chooses 14 other delegates during the state convention on June 7, 2008. In addition, Minnesota holds non-binding caucuses on February 5, 2008.

Indiana primary

Primary date: May 6, 2008
National delegates: 27 (see note below)

Indiana chooses 27 other delegates during the state convention from June 9 to June 10, 2008.

North Carolina primary

Primary date: May 6, 2008
National delegates: 69

Nebraska primary

Primary date: May 13, 2008
National delegates: 33

West Virginia primary

Primary date: May 13, 2008
National delegates: 9 (see note below)

West Virginia chooses 18 other delegates during caucuses on February 5, 2008.

*Candidate suspended campaign prior to this primary

Kentucky primary

Primary date: May 20, 2008
National delegates: 45

New York state committee meeting
Meeting dates: May 20, 2008 – May 21, 2008
National delegates: 11 (see note below)

New York chooses 87 other delegates during a primary on February 5, 2008.

Oregon primary

Primary date: May 20, 2008
National delegates: 30

Kansas state committee meeting
Meeting date: May 22, 2008
National delegates: 10

Kansas chooses 26 other delegates during a primary on February 9, 2008.

Colorado district conventions
Convention dates: May 24, 2008 – June 7, 2008
National delegates: 21 (see note below)

Colorado chooses 22 other delegates during caucuses on February 5, 2008.

Idaho primary

Primary date: May 27, 2008
National delegates: 26

Wyoming state convention
Convention date: May 31, 2008
National delegates: 2 (see note below)

Wyoming held county conventions on January 5, 2008 to choose 12 other delegates. Also, in accordance with Republican National Committee rules, Wyoming was stripped of half of its 28 delegates for holding primary contests before February 5, 2008.

South Dakota primary

Primary date: June 3, 2008
National delegates: 24

New Mexico primary

Primary date: June 3, 2008
National delegates: 29

Pennsylvania state committee meeting
Meeting date: June 6, 2008 – June 7, 2008
National delegates: 9 (see note below)

Pennsylvania chooses 62 other delegates during a primary on April 22, 2008.

Illinois state convention
Convention date: June 7, 2008
National delegates: 10 (see note below)

Illinois chooses 57 other delegates during a primary on February 5, 2008.

Minnesota state convention
Convention date: June 7, 2008
National delegates: 14 (see note below)

Minnesota chooses 24 other delegates during district conventions from May 3 to May 24, 2008. In addition, Minnesota holds non-binding caucuses on February 5, 2008.

Indiana state convention
Convention dates: June 9, 2008 – June 10, 2008
National delegates: 27 (see note below)

Indiana chooses 27 other delegates during a primary on  May 6, 2008.

Nebraska state convention
Convention date: July 12, 2008
National delegates: 33 (see note below)

Nebraska's National Convention delegates are not bound by the results of the Presidential Preference Primary held on May 13, 2008.

See also
Results of the 2008 Democratic Party presidential primaries
Super Tuesday (2008)

References

2008 United States Republican presidential primaries